Juan Ángel Bustos Pizarro (born 16 January 1961), known as Ángel Bustos, is a Chilean former professional footballer who played as a winger for clubs in Chile and Mexico.

Club career
Born in Antofagasta, Chile, he represented the city team at national level and next he joined Deportes Antofagasta while he studied to get a degree in engineering. In Chile, he also played for Unión La Calera, Huachipato, Colo-Colo, Cobreloa, Fernández Vial and Deportes Ovalle, where he retired.

In Mexico he played for Morelia, Venados Yucatán and Pumas UNAM. He is a historical player of Morelia, where he played between 1987 and 1990 and scored 32 goals. As important facts, in his first season with the club he became the top goalscorer with 18 goals and also he scored the first goal in the Estadio Morelos versus América on 9 April 1989. In addition, he and his Chilean fellows Marco Antonio Figueroa and Juan Carlos Vera are well remembered as a prolific attacking trident. For Pumas UNAM, he made 10 appearances in the 1993–94 season and didn't score.

Personal life
Following his retirement, he worked as coach in the Deportes Antofagasta youth system for 14 years from U6 to U19 level. Next, he has worked in a family transport company.

References

External links
 
 
 Ángel Bustos at playmakerstats.com (English version of ceroacero.es)

1961 births
Living people
People from Antofagasta
Chilean footballers
Chilean expatriate footballers
Association football midfielders
C.D. Antofagasta footballers
Unión La Calera footballers
C.D. Huachipato footballers
Colo-Colo footballers
Atlético Morelia players
Cobreloa footballers
C.D. Arturo Fernández Vial footballers
Venados F.C. players
Club Universidad Nacional footballers
Deportes Ovalle footballers
Primera B de Chile players
Chilean Primera División players
Liga MX players
Ascenso MX players
Chilean expatriate sportspeople in Mexico
Expatriate footballers in Mexico
Chilean football managers